Fangshan is a county in the west of Shanxi province, China. It is under the administration of Lüliang City.

Climate

See also
 North Wudang Mountain

References

External links
www.xzqh.org 

County-level divisions of Shanxi